Agni-Kuči is an alternative name advanced by Bernard Sergent for:

 Tocharians, an ancient people who inhabited the Tarim Basin in Central Asia
 Tocharian languages, two (or perhaps three) Indo-European languages spoken by those people